Polyporus umbellatus is an edible species of mushroom, found growing on roots of old beeches or oak (e.g.). It is also called lumpy bracket and umbrella polypore.

Description
The fruit body is composed of numerous (sometimes several hundred) caps. They are 1–4 cm in diameter, deeply umbilicate, light brown, and form the extremities of a strong, many branched stalk. The compound fungus can be up to 40 cm in diameter. 
The pores are narrow and white. The stalk is whitish grey, and originates from a strong, tuber-like nodule that is underground. The flesh is white, rather soft when young, although hardens with age.

Edibility and cooking
Choice edible.

Bioactive compounds
Polyporus umbellatus  may contain bioactive compounds with immunostimulating, anticancer, anti-inflammatory, and hepatoprotective properties.

References

umbellatus
Fungi of Europe
Fungi described in 1821